The Story of Joanna is a 1975 pornographic film directed by Gerard Damiano and starring Jamie Gillis and Terri Hall. The film has a sado-masochism theme influenced by Story of O (1954). It is considered one of the classics of the Golden Age of Porn (1969–1984). It has been inducted into the XRCO Hall of Fame.

Cast
 Jamie Gillis as Jason
 Terri Hall as Joanna
 Zebedy Colt as Griffin
 Juliet Graham as Gena
 Steven Lark as Dancer

Reception
Roger Feelbert from Pornonomy gave the film a B− rating, stating: "Technically, the film looked great - in particular, the scene between Graham and Colt would have to rank as one of the best shot hardcore scenes I can remember - but suffers from uneven pacing. It's dark in tone, but not as arresting as, say, 3 AM or Damiano's Devil in Miss Jones. I'm glad I saw it, but there's little chance I'll ever revisit (except, maybe, to check out that Graham/Colt scene.)."

See also
 List of American films of 1975

References

External links
 
 Novelization

1975 films
1970s pornographic films
American pornographic films
1970s English-language films
BDSM in films
Films directed by Gerard Damiano
1970s American films